The 2019 season for the CCC Pro Team began in January with the Tour Down Under. As a UCI WorldTeam, they were automatically invited and obligated to send a squad to every event in the UCI World Tour.

Team roster

Riders who joined the team for the 2019 season

Riders who left the team during or after the 2018 season

Season victories

National, Continental and World champions

Footnotes

References

External links
 

2019 road cycling season by team
C
2019 in Polish sport